Helen C. Purchase is a researcher in information visualization, graph drawing, and human–computer interaction. She has held academic appointments at The University of Queensland (1992-2001), The University of Glasgow (2001-2022) and Monash University (2022-present).

Purchase earned a PhD from the University of Cambridge (Peterhouse, 1992). 

She has won Teaching Excellence Awards from The University of Queensland (1999)  and The University of Glasgow (2011).

Purchase has been a Keynote Speaker at the following conferences:
 12e Conférence Internationale Francophone sur l'Extraction et la Gestion des Connaissances (EGC 2012, Bordeaux, France) 
 7th International Symposium on Visual Information Communication & Interaction (VINCI 2014, Sydney, Australia) 
 IEEE Working Conference on Software Visualization (VISSOFT 2018, Madrid, Spain) 
 International Conference on Information Visualization Theory and Applications (IVAPP 2020, Valletta, Malta) 
 Southern African Computer Lecturers' Association Conference (SACLA 2020, Virtual  from Rhodes University, Grahamstown, South Africa) 
 OxBridge Women in Computer Science Conference (OxWoCS 2020, Virtual from The University of Cambridge, UK) 

She is the author of Experimental Human-Computer Interaction (Cambridge University Press, 2012)

References

External links
Home page

Year of birth missing (living people)
Living people
British computer scientists
British women computer scientists
Alumni of the University of Cambridge
Academic staff of the University of Queensland
Academics of the University of Glasgow
Graph drawing people